The 1930 Fordham Rams football team was an American football team that represented Fordham University as an independent during the 1930 college football season. In its fourth year under head coach Frank Cavanaugh, Fordham compiled an 8–1 record, shut out six of nine opponents, and outscored all opponents by a total of 215 to 29.

Schedule

References

Fordham
Fordham Rams football seasons
Fordham Rams football